Dune: Chronicles of the Imperium is a role-playing game published by Last Unicorn Games in 2000.

History
Brian Herbert entered into negotiations with Last Unicorn Games (LUG) that got LUG a 1996 license to the Dune novels, and they soon completed the design of their Dune Collectible Card Game (1997), which was developed and published by Five Rings Publishing Group.  LUG finished work on a Dune role-playing game, but the game was not printed due to legal disputes over the Herbert license.  When Wizards of the Coast acquired LUG, they agreed as part of the deal to release LUG's remaining projects.  One of these games was the Icon system-based Dune: Chronicles of the Imperium (2000), which they published in a limited released of just 3,000 copies. Most of these copies were made available at Gen Con 33 and other overseas conventions, but the limited print run was not enough to satisfy the demand. Afterwards, the Frank Herbert estate offered to renegotiate the license but they wanted much larger fees from Wizards than they had received from LUG; thus Wizards lost the Dune license, and a d20 Dune book that the Last Unicorn team was working on was subsequently shelved.

Description
The game is set in the Dune universe. Delayed by legal issues and then a corporate buy-out of Last Unicorn by Wizards of the Coast, a "Limited Edition" run of 3000 copies of a core rule-book was initially published, pending Wizards of the Coast's conversion of the game to its d20 role-playing game system and a subsequent wider release. The company later announced that the game would be discontinued.

Dune: Chronicles of the Imperium was developed by Last Unicorn Games, but published by Wizards of the Coast after the acquisition.

Val Mayerik did interior art for the game.

References

External links
Check out an excerpt from a never-published Dune RPG on Gizmodo

Games based on Dune (franchise)
Last Unicorn Games games
Role-playing games based on novels
Role-playing games introduced in 2000
Science fiction role-playing games